Julio Iglesias Puga (25 July 1915 – 19 December 2005) was a Spanish gynecologist. He was the father of singer Julio Iglesias and grandfather to the singers Enrique Iglesias and Julio Iglesias Jr. and socialite Chabeli Iglesias. He was nicknamed Papuchi, "Daddy".
 
He helped to found the Madrid Maternity Clinic and became the head of its sterility, infertility and family planning unit.

Life and career
Iglesias was born in Ourense. During the Spanish Civil War, Iglesias fought for the Nationalists led by General Franco. In 1943, he married María del Rosario de la Cueva y Perignat and the couple had two sons Julio Iglesias and Carlos. They divorced in 1983.

In December 1981 he was kidnapped by Basque separatist organisation ETA and held for two weeks, eventually being rescued by a police anti-terrorism unit. He became a fixture of gossip magazines, always ready to chat with journalists revealing information about his famous descendants. Such magazines always referred to him by his title and surnames, Doctor Iglesias Puga, to distinguish him from his son and grandson.

In the early 1990s, he met US citizen Ronna Keith. The couple married in 2001 in a secret ceremony witnessed by close family and photographers from a magazine.

On May 18, 2004, Keith gave birth to a boy, Jaime Iglesias, when Julio Sr. was 88 and Ronna was 40. Jaime's half-brother, Julio, was 60 years old at the time. Jaime's nephews were 31-year-old Julio Jr. and 29-year-old Enrique, and his niece was 32-year-old Chabeli. After Jaime was born in 2004, Iglesias rejected suggestions that Ronna was the driving force behind their decision to start a family. "At my age, a child is marvellous... I felt just like Abraham," he declared. "If people say I just did it for my wife, I don't take it as an insult, but the truth is I wanted to do it just as much as she did... My wife wanted to do it and we did it... It was an act of generosity towards her. I leave her part of my blood, of my life. I need her so much that I said to her, 'Here, this is what you wanted for when I am gone.'"

Shortly after announcing the arrival of her first baby, Ronna underwent fertility treatment in order to conceive again. IVF treatment is speculated to have been used for their second child.

Iglesias died in Madrid the morning of December 19, 2005, at the age of 90. Ruth Iglesias, his fourth child, was born on July 26, 2006, 7 months after her father died.

See also
List of kidnappings
List of solved missing person cases
List of oldest fathers

References

External links
Obituary in The Times, 20 December 2005

1915 births
1980s missing person cases
2005 deaths
20th-century Spanish physicians
21st-century Spanish physicians
Formerly missing people
Julio Sr.
Missing person cases in Spain
Kidnapped Spanish people
People from Ourense
Spanish gynaecologists